Adam Stefan Śmigielski (24 December 1933 in Przemyśl − 7 October 2008 in Sosnowiec) was a Polish Roman Catholic bishop.

Ordained to the priesthood on 30 June 1957, Śmigielski was named bishop of the Roman Catholic Diocese of Sosnowiec, Poland on 25 March 1992 and died of cancer while still in office on 7 October 2008.

References

1933 births
2008 deaths
Deaths from cancer in Poland
People from Przemyśl
20th-century Roman Catholic bishops in Poland